Mário Damião Hipólito (born 1 June 1985) is an Angolan football goalkeeper.

Career
Hipólito  was born in Luanda. He was called up to the 2006 World Cup, despite never having previously appeared for the national team.

External links

1985 births
Living people
Footballers from Luanda
Angolan footballers
Angola international footballers
2006 FIFA World Cup players
2008 Africa Cup of Nations players
Association football goalkeepers
Kabuscorp S.C.P. players
F.C. Bravos do Maquis players
G.D. Interclube players
2016 African Nations Championship players
Angola A' international footballers